Les Bois-d'Anjou (literally The Woods of Anjou) is a commune in the Maine-et-Loire department of western France. The municipality was established on 1 January 2016 and consists of the former communes of Fontaine-Guérin, Brion and Saint-Georges-du-Bois.

See also 
Communes of the Maine-et-Loire department

References 

Communes of Maine-et-Loire